The Natal Railway Company was formed in January 1859 for the construction of a  railway in Durban.

The Natal Railway Company made use of  broad gauge. The  was only adopted in Natal in 1876 when the Natal Government Railways was established.

The railway's first steam locomotive, the  Natal, started operations on 26 June 1860. Up until that time the railway had been operated using ox-drawn wagons. The inaugural run was across a  stretch from Market Square in Durban to the newly built Point station at Durban harbour.

Alexander McArthur, the mayor of Durban described the new line in a letter to Sir George Grey.

The Natal Railway Company's initial rolling stock consisted of six wagons, two travelling cranes and one passenger coach. By 25 January 1867 the line had been extended a further  to Umgeni, from where stone, quarried from the Umgeni River, was transported to the harbour.

All the assets of the Natal Railway Company, including its locomotive fleet of three, were purchased for the sum of £40,000 by the Natal Colonial Government in 1876. The railway continued to operate under the Natal Railway name until it became part of the Natal Government Railways with effect from 1 January 1877. The Natal remained in service for fifteen years, but since the newly established Natal Government Railways adopted  Cape gauge in conformance with the railways in the Cape Province, the existing lines were also converted to Cape gauge.

See also
 Rail transport in South Africa

References

Defunct railway companies of South Africa
Standard gauge railways in South Africa
History of Durban
Transport in Durban
Railway companies established in 1859
Railway companies disestablished in 1877
1859 establishments in South Africa
1877 disestablishments in Africa